Thomas Francis Enright was the first Pennsylvanian serviceman and perhaps the first American serviceman to die in World War I, along with Corporal James Bethel Gresham of Evansville, Indiana and Private Merle Hay of Glidden, Iowa.

Early life and military service 

Thomas Francis Enright was born May 8, 1887, in Bloomfield, Pennsylvania. He was the seventh child of Irish immigrants, Ellen and John Enright. He was also their first child not to be born in Ireland. He enlisted in the U.S. Army in 1909. He had served in post-Boxer Rebellion China and earned the title expert cavalryman while fighting Moros during the Philippine Insurrection. By 1914, he was serving in Veracruz with the 16th Infantry Regiment. In 1916, he was in Mexico again serving under General John J. Pershing, during his expedition to locate and capture Pancho Villa. Sometime after this, he left the army and returned to the Pittsburgh area.

World War I service 

After a short return to Pittsburgh, Enright reenlisted and joined the 16th Infantry at Fort Bliss, Texas.  On 26 June 1917, the regiment disembarked in St. Nazaire, France, as part of the 1st Infantry Division.  Four months later, Enright's company was moved to the trenches near Artois, France.  In the early morning of 3 November 1917,  the Imperial German Army attacked.  After an hour of fighting, Enright, along with Corporal James Bethel Gresham, and Private Merle Hay were the first three casualties of the American Expeditionary Force.

Two days later, on 5 Nov 1917, Enright, Gresham, and Hay were buried near the battlefield where they had died. An inscription marked their graves: "Here lie the first soldiers of the illustrious Republic of the United States who fell on French soil for justice and liberty."  Their bodies were eventually returned to their families and reburied in the United States.  On 16 July 1921, the city of Pittsburgh honored him with his casket lying in state at the Soldiers and Sailors National Military Museum and Memorial located in the city's Oakland section. The funeral procession was led by a gun casson drawn by six horse followed by a memorial service, led by Bishop of Pittsburgh, Hugh Charles Boyle, was held at the St. Paul Cathedral. Afterwards the procession continued  to St. Mary Cemetery in the city's Lawrenceville neighborhood where Enright was reburied with full military honors after which a wreath from General Pershing was laid upon his grave.

See also 
Albert Mayer (soldier), the first Imperial German Army soldier killed, 1914
Jules Andre Peugeot, the first French Army soldier killed, 1914
John Parr, the first British Army soldier killed, 1914
James Bethel Gresham, one of the first three American Army soldiers killed, 1917
Merle Hay,  one of the first three American Army soldiers killed, 1917
George Edwin Ellison, the last British Army soldier killed in World War I, at 9:30 a.m. 11 November
Augustin Trébuchon, last French soldier killed, at 10:45 a.m. 11 November
George Lawrence Price, last Commonwealth soldier killed in World War I, 10:58 a.m. 11 November.
Henry Gunther, last soldier killed in World War I, at 10:59 a.m. 11 November.

References

External links 

 Michael Connors (2007). Finding Private Enright: Ninety years ago this month, the first Americans died in World War I. Thomas Enright of Pittsburgh was one of the three. Here is the story of a forgotten hero.. Retrieved from the Pittsburgh Post-Gazette November 11, 2007.
 Heiman Blatt (1920).  Sons of Men: Evansville's War Record

1887 births
1917 deaths
Military personnel from Pittsburgh
American military personnel killed in World War I
United States Army soldiers
American people of Irish descent